A catalyst is a substance which increases the rate of a chemical reaction.

Catalyst may also refer to:

Buildings 
 Catalyst (building), a high-rise  in Charlotte, North Carolina
 Catalyst (museum), a hands-on science centre and chemical industry museum in Widnes in Cheshire in England
 The Catalyst (nightclub), a music venue in Santa Cruz, California

Economics and finance
 Economic catalyst
 Stock catalyst

Events
 Catalyst Conference, an annual nondenominational Christian event

Media and entertainment

Games
Catalyst (role-playing game supplements), a series of fantasy role-playing game supplements
 Catalyst, an indie role-playing game published by Cherry Picked Games in 2015
The Catalyst, a fictional character in Mass Effect 3.

Literature and publications
Catalyst (journal), left-wing scholarly journal published by Jacobin (magazine) 
 Catalyst (magazine), published by the RMIT University Student Union
 Catalyst (novel), by Laurie Halse Anderson
 Catalyst, fourth book in Fletcher DeLancey's Chronicles of Alsea series
The Catalyst (Doctor Who audio), a 2008 Doctor Who audiobook
 The Catalyst (American newspaper), an American weekly newspaper
 The Catalyst (Philippine newspaper), the official student publication of the Polytechnic University of the Philippines
 Catalyst, a freesheet of the Solidarity Federation
 Catalyst, a magazine published by the Commission for Racial Equality in the United Kingdom
 Catalyst, a publication of the Union of Concerned Scientists
 The Catalyst, a science fiction novel by Charles L. Harness
 Catalyst, the journal  of the Catholic League for Religious and Civil Rights
 Catalyst: A Rogue One Novel, a direct prequel novel to the 2016 film Rogue One: A Star Wars Story

Music
 Catalyst (New Found Glory album)
 Catalyst (Prototype album), 2012
 Catalyst (band), a funk-jazz band
 "The Catalyst", a 2010 song by Linkin Park

Television and film
 Catalyst (TV program), an Australian science journal
 "Catalysts" (The Spectacular Spider-Man), an episode of the animated television series The Spectacular Spider-Man
 Catalyst, a BBC Two television ident first aired in 2000 (see BBC Two '1991–2001' idents)
 Catalyst, a feature film scheduled for release in 2021

Organizations 
 Catalyst (nonprofit organization), an organization that promotes inclusive workplaces for women
 Catalyst (science park), Northern Ireland
 Catalyst (think tank), a socialist left political think tank based in London, United Kingdom
 Catalyst Paper, a Canadian paper mill company
 Catalyst Technologies, one of the first company incubators, founded by Nolan Bushnell

Technology 
 Catalyst (software), a web application framework
 Alchemy Catalyst, an Internationalization and localization tool
 AMD Catalyst, formerly ATI Catalyst, a software suite for graphic cards
 Cisco Catalyst, a line of network switches
 General Electric Catalyst, a turboprop aircraft engine under development by GE Aviation
 Catalyst, a line of automatic test equipment produced by Teradyne
 AudioCatalyst, a software package from Xing Technology
 Gentoo Catalyst, a tool to create Gentoo Linux environments
 Mac Catalyst, allows iPad apps to run as a Mac app

See also 
 Catalist, an American corporation
 Catalytic converter, a device in modern vehicles to reduce emissions
 Katalyst (disambiguation)
 Qatalyst Group, a corporate advisory firm